Moussa Souare (born 1 July 1998), is a Guinean professional footballer who plays as a forward for Italian club Sancataldese.

Club career

Internazionale

Loan to Monopoli and Mosta 
On 11 August 2017, Souare was signed by Serie C side Monopoli on a 6-month loan deal. On 26 August, Souare made his Serie C debut in a 3–1 home win over Cosenza, he was replaced by Davide Balestrero in the 69th minute. Souare ended his 6-month loan to Monopoli with 13 appearances, but he never played an entire match.

On 31 January 2018, Souare was loaned to Maltese Premier League side Mosta on an 18-month loan deal. On 25 February he made his Maltese Premier League debut in a 2–0 home defeat against Hamrun Spartans, he played the entire match.

La Fiorita

On 25 January 2019, Souare moved to Sammarinese club La Fiorita.

Career statistics

Club

Honours

Club 
Inter Primavera

 Campionato Nazionale Primavera: 2016–17

References

External links

1998 births
Living people
Guinean footballers
Guinean expatriate footballers
Association football forwards
U.S. Sassuolo Calcio players
Bologna F.C. 1909 players
Inter Milan players
S.S. Monopoli 1966 players
Mosta F.C. players
S.P. La Fiorita players
Forlì F.C. players
Serie C players
Serie D players
Maltese Premier League players
Guinean expatriate sportspeople in Italy
Expatriate footballers in Italy
Expatriate footballers in Malta
Expatriate footballers in San Marino
Guinean expatriate sportspeople in Malta